Juan Agustín Uricoechea Navarro (August 28, 1824 - September 11, 1883) was a Colombian lawyer and politician, interim president of the United States of Colombia temporarily replacing Tomás Cipriano de Mosquera during the war with ecuador

Presidents of Colombia
1824 births
1883 deaths